Puadhi (IAST: [puādhī], sometimes spelled as Poadhi, Powadhi, or Pwadhi) is a dialect of Punjabi primarily spoken in the Puadh region of northern India.  It is spoken between the Sutlej and Ghaggar river basins in the present day states of Punjab and Haryana, and the union territory of Chandigarh and Uttar Pradesh

Puadh extends from Rupnagar near Satluj up to the Ghaggar river and its tributaries, Markanda and Som in the east, which lie in northern Haryana up to Kala Amb in Nahan district of Himachal Pradesh.

To the west it extends into the Puadh tract of Ludhiana where the westernmost spoken varieties of the Puadhi dialect form a continuum with Malwai and in north it blend with doabi Puadhi's western boundary also extends into Fatehgarh Sahib and Patiala districts and its influence is observed in the southwest in the adjacent areas of Kaithal and Kurukshetra districts up to northern areas of Jind distinct such as Ujhana and Dhamtan Sahib and its westernmost boundary extends into parts of Fatehabad district of Haryana.

The language is spoken over a large area in present Punjab as well as Haryana. Puadhi is also spoken in other areas: Kharar, Kurali, Rupnagar, Morinda, Chandigarh, Pail, Rajpura, Samrala in Punjab as well as Ambala, Naraingarh, Sadaura, Panchkula, Shahabad, Barara, Thana Chappar], Bilaspur, Saraswati Nagar, Pehowa, North of Kaithal and Tohana etc. in Haryana.

Grammar 

 Genitive postposition: The genitive case particles of ਕਾ kā, ਕੀ kī, ਕੇ ke and ਕੀਆਂ kiān are found in Puadhi, as compared to most other dialects which use ਦਾ dā, ਦੀ dī, ਦੇ de and ਦੀਆਂ diān. Puadhi shares this grammatical trait with neighbouring dialects of Bangru and Bagri. In Punjabi, this form of second case is also observed intermittently in villages that speak Malwai.
 Ablative postposition: ਤੇ te is the Puadhi equivalent of Majhi ਤੋਂ ton, similarly ਗੇਲੇ gele is used instead of ਨਾਲੋਂ nalon.
 Topic marker: In addition to ਤੇ te and ਤਾ ta, ਤੋ to and ਤੌ tō are also commonly used. The latter ਤੌ is pronounced as a diphthong when emphasized. All four nominative particles are the same in Puadhi as in Bangru, which is spoken to its immediate south.

Vocabulary 
The Puadhi dialect has many words that differ from other dialects of Punjabi.

Examples

See also 

 Puadh
 Languages of India
 List of Indian languages by total speakers
 Languages of Pakistan
 List of Punjabi television channels

References 

Languages of India
Languages of Punjab, India
Punjabi dialects